The Eastern Romance languages are a group of Romance languages. Today, the group consists of the Daco-Romance subgroup, which comprises the Romanian language (Daco-Romanian), Aromanian language and two other related minor languages, Megleno-Romanian, and Istro-Romanian.

Some classifications also include the extinct Dalmatian language (otherwise included in the Italo-Dalmatian group) as part of the Daco-Romance subgroup, considering Dalmatian a bridge between Italian and Romanian.

Samples of Eastern Romance languages
Note: the lexicon used below is not universally recognized

See also
 Balkan sprachbund
 Common Romanian
 Substrate in Romanian

References

Sources